Venezuela competed at the 1960 Summer Olympics held in Rome, Italy. 36 competitors, 31 men and 5 women, were selected by the Comité Olímpico Venezolano to take part in 26 events in 9 sports. The Venezuelan representation was similar to that of the Helsinki Games that awarded the country first olympic medal but including for the first time a Venezuelan sailing and weightlifting representation. The sporting shooter Enrico Forcella won the nation's second ever Olympic medal and to date solely Olympic medallist in shooting. Women's return after being absent from the previous game, competing in fencing like before but also for the first time in swimming.

Medalists

Bronze
 Enrico Forcella — Shooting, Men's Small-Bore Rifle, Prone position, 50 metres

Competitors

Athletics

Rafael Romero
Clive Bonas
Horacio Estévez
Lloyd Murad
Emilio Romero
Héctor Thomas
Víctor Maldonado

Boxing

Miguel Amarista
Fidel Odremán
Mario Romero

Cycling

Five cyclists, all men, represented Venezuela in 1960.

Individual road race
 Arsenio Chirinos
 Emilio Vidal
 José Ferreira
 Francisco Mujica

Team time trial
 José Ferreira
 Francisco Mujica
 Arsenio Chirinos
 Víctor Chirinos

Fencing

Eight fencers, four men and four women, represented Venezuela in 1960.

Men's foil
 Jesús Gruber
 Freddy Quintero
 Luis García

Men's team foil
 Luis García, Freddy Quintero, Augusto Gutiérrez, Jesús Gruber

Men's sabre
 Augusto Gutiérrez
 Luis García

Women's foil
 Belkis Leal
 Norma Santini
 Ingrid Sander

Women's team foil
 Ingrid Sander, Norma Santini, Belkis Leal, Teófila Márquiz

Sailing

Daniel Camejo Octavio
Peter Camejo Guanche

Shooting

Six shooters represented Venezuela in 1960. Enrico Forcella won the bronze in the 50m rifle, prone event.

25 m pistol
 Carlos Crassus
 Carlos Monteverde

50 m rifle, prone
 Enrico Forcella
 José Cazorla

Trap
 Bram Zanella
 Franco Bonato

Swimming

Annelisse Rockenbach
Alberto Feo Corao

Weightlifting

Oswaldo Solórzano
Enrique Guitens

Wrestling

Rafael Durán
César Ferreras

References

External links
Official Olympic Reports
International Olympic Committee results database

Nations at the 1960 Summer Olympics
1960
1960 in Venezuelan sport